Oetinger is a surname. Notable people with the surname include:

Ferdinand Christoph Oetinger (1719–1772), German physician
Friedrich Christoph Oetinger (1702–1782), German Lutheran theologian and theosopher